Yanacancha District is one of nine districts of the province Chupaca in Peru.

See also 
 Kuntur Tiyana
 Qiwllaqucha
 Tuqtu
 Wachwa Runtu

References